Lakhnauti Turk is a village situated in the Gangoh Mandal of Saharanpur District in Uttar Pradesh, India. It is located 486 kilometres from the state capital at Lucknow.

Villages in Saharanpur district